William E. Ritchie (? – May 12, 1943) was a trick bicyclist who performed with Will Rogers and W. C. Fields.

References

1943 deaths
Vaudeville performers
Year of birth missing